The Squirrels is an American pop band.

The Squirrels may also refer to:
The Squirrels (Highland Falls, New York), an estate on the National Register of Historic Places
The Squirrels (TV series), a 1970s British sitcom
"The Squirrels", an episode from season 10 of Arthur

See also
Squirrel (disambiguation)